

Bolesław, Boleslaw, Boleslav or Boleslaus in Latin, is a male given name of Slavic origin meaning great glory. Feminine forms: Bolesława / Boleslava.

It was the favoured dynastic name in the Polish Piast dynasty and also, to a considerably lesser extent, among the Czech Přemyslids. Into the Piasts was borrowed from Přemyslids through inheritance in female line. (The mother of first Polish monarch of that name, i.e. Boleslaus the Brave, was the Czech princess Doubravka of Bohemia, whose father and brother bore the name "Boleslav".) Rulers of the Silesian line of the Piast dynasty were often known by the shortened version of the name, Bolko. In total, 45 kings and dukes from the House of Piast bore the name.

List of people with given name Boleslaw, Boleslav or Bolesław

Polish historical rulers from the House of Piast
Bolesław I of Poland (ca. 966 – 1025), known as 'the Brave' or 'the Valiant', Duke of Poland from 992 to 1025 (ending in 1025 as King of Poland)
Bolesław II of Poland (1039–1081), known as 'the Bold', 'the Generous' or 'the Cruel', Duke of Poland 1058 to 1076 and King of Poland 1076 to 1079
Bolesław III Wrymouth (1085–1138), Duke of Poland from 1102 to 1138
Bolesław IV the Curly (1120–1173), High Duke of Poland from 1146 to 1173
Bolesław of Kuyavia (1159–1195), Duke of Kuyavia from c. 1186 to 1195
Bolesław I of Cieszyn, Duke of Cieszyn
Bolesław II of Cieszyn, Duke of Cieszyn
Bolesław II Rogatka (1220/5–1278), Duke of Silesia, portions of Poland
Bolesław V the Chaste (1226–1279), mid-13th century Duke of Kraków, who rebuilt the city after its destruction in 1241
Bolesław the Pious (c. 1224 – 1279), Duke of Greater Poland 1239–1247
Bolesław I of Masovia (1208–1248), Duke of Sandomierz, Sieradz (1233–1234), and Masovia (1229–1248)
Bolesław II of Masovia, Duke of Masovia (c. 1250 – 1313)
Bolesław the Elder ( 1293–1365), Duke of Wielun, Niemodlin, who often goes by the name Bolko
Bolesław Jerzy of Mazovia, Duke of Masovia and Galicia-Volhynia (died 1340)
Bolesław III of Płock, Duke of Płock (c. 1325 – 1351)
Bolesław IV of Warsaw, Duke of Warsaw (1421–1454)
Bolesław V of Warsaw, Duke of Warsaw, Zakroczym, Nur, Płock, and Wizna (1454–1488)

Polish-Silesian rulers from House of Piast known as Bolkos
Bolko I the Strict (1252/56–1301), Duke of Lwówek, Jawor, Świdnica, Ziębice/Münsterberg
Bolko I of Opole (1258–1313), Duke of Opole, Niemodlin, Strzelce Opolskie
Bolko II of Ziębice (1300–1341), Duke of Ziębice/Münsterberg
Bolko II of Ziębice (1300–1341), Duke of Ziębice/Münsterberg
Bolko II of Opole (1300–1356), Duke of Opole
Bolko II the Small (1312–1368), Duke of Świdnica Jawor, Lwówek, Lusatia, Siewierz, who was the last independent Duke of the Piast dynasty in Silesia
Bolko III of Strzelce ( 1337–1382), Duke of Opole, Strzelce
Bolko III of Münsterberg ( 1348–1410), Duke of Ziębice/Münsterberg
Bolko IV of Opole (1363/67–1437), Duke of Strzelce, Niemodlin, Opole
Bolko V the Hussite (ca. 1400–1460), Duke of Opole, Głogówek, Prudnik, Strzelce, Niemodlin, Olesno

Czech historical rulers

Boleslaus I of Bohemia (died 967 or 972), known as 'the Cruel', ruling from 929 (or 935) to 972 (or 967)
Boleslaus II of Bohemia (c. 920 – 999), known as 'the Pious', ruling from 972 to 999
Boleslaus III of Bohemia (died 1037), known as 'the Red' or 'the Blind', ruling from 999 to 1002

Other historical rulers

Boleslaw, 12th-century Swedish king
Burislav, mythical Wendish or Polish king

Other 
Boleslaus, Bishop of Vác, Hungarian prelate
Bolesław Bierut, former President of Poland
Bolesław Bronisław Duch, Polish Major General and General Inspector of the Armed Forces
Boleslav Jablonský, Czech poet and catholic priest
Bolesław Prus, foremost figure in Polish literature of the late 19th century, and a distinctive voice in world literature
Boleslav Polívka, Czech actor
Bill Sienkiewicz, award-winning American comics artist, whose full given name is Boleslav William Felix Robert Sienkiewicz
Bolesław Wieniawa-Długoszowski, Polish general, adjutant to Chief of State, politician, freemason, diplomat, poet, artist, and formally, for one day, President of the Republic of Poland
Peter Boleslaw Schmeichel, former Danish goalkeeper

See also
Pulß
Václav (disambiguation)
Wenceslaus (disambiguation)

References

Slavic masculine given names
Czech masculine given names
Polish masculine given names